This is a list of the Bangladesh women's national football team results from 2010 to the present.

Record

By competition

Source: Results

By venue

By opponent

Source: Results

Results and fixtures

2022

2021

2019

2018

2017

2016

2014

2013

2012

2011

2010

References

External links
 Bangladesh results at FIFA.com
 Bangladesh results at soccerway.com

 
2010s in Bangladesh